Caitlin Anne Lever (born March 12, 1985) is an American-Canadian softball outfielder.

Early life
Lever was born in Morristown, New Jersey, when her father Don Lever played for the New Jersey Devils of the National Hockey League (NHL). Due to her birth in the US, Lever is a dual citizen of the United States and Canada. In her youth, she played ice hockey. She graduated from the Georgia Institute of Technology in 2007. In her final year playing for the Georgia Tech Yellow Jackets softball team, she set team records for hits and on-base percentage.

Career
She played for Canada at the 2008 Summer Olympics.

From 2008 to 2011, Lever played for the Chicago Bandits of National Pro Fastpitch.

Personal
She currently resides in Buffalo, New York.

Her father and uncle are both former NHL players: Don Lever and Rick Ley, respectively.

References

External links

Profile at CBC Olympics
Caitlin Lever: Georgia Tech Player Bio
Caitlin Lever: Canisius Player Bio

1985 births
Living people
Canadian sportswomen
Softball players at the 2008 Summer Olympics
Olympic softball players of Canada
Sportspeople from Buffalo, New York
People from Morristown, New Jersey
Sportspeople from Morris County, New Jersey
Georgia Tech Yellow Jackets softball players
Canisius Golden Griffins softball players
Softball players from New Jersey
Chicago Bandits players
Carolina Diamonds players